Jackson's Mill State 4-H Camp Historic District, also known as West Virginia University Jackson's Mill, is a historic 4-H camp and national historic district near Weston, Lewis County, West Virginia. The district includes 23 contributing buildings, 4 contributing sites, 4 contributing structures, and 2 contributing objects. The camp was established in 1921 as the first statewide 4-H camp in the United States. The district includes buildings related to the site's inception as a homestead and agricultural area as well as its current manifestation as a youth camp facility and conference center.

Notable contributing resources include the Mount Vernon Dining Hall (1926), Assembly Hall (1923), West Virginia Building (1934), Council Circle (1922), Amphitheatre (1940), Vesper Rock (1925), Teepi Shrine (1949), Dominion Trail (1942), 15 residential cottages, the Southeastern Learning Center (c. 1940), Electric Energy Center (1940), Dorsey Resource Center (1978), Registration Office/Old Health Center (1950), Old Administration Building (1952), McWhorter Cabin (1793, 1927), Informal Garden (c. 1934), Jackson Homestead Marker (1915), Jackson Spring (1922), Camp Gates (1942), Camp Green (1922), and Maintenance Garage (1935).  It is co-located with the separately listed Jackson's Mill. The property was the boyhood home of Confederate General Thomas “Stonewall” Jackson from 1831 to 1842.

It was listed on the National Register of Historic Places in 2005.

References

External links

1921 establishments in West Virginia
American Craftsman architecture in West Virginia
Buildings and structures in Lewis County, West Virginia
Bungalow architecture in West Virginia
Colonial Revival architecture in West Virginia
Historic districts in Lewis County, West Virginia
National Register of Historic Places in Lewis County, West Virginia
Summer camps in West Virginia
West Virginia University
4-H
Historic districts on the National Register of Historic Places in West Virginia
Temporary populated places on the National Register of Historic Places